Shady Grove is a 1969 studio album by Quicksilver Messenger Service.

Recording 
Nicky Hopkins, the English journeyman pianist who appears on albums by Jeff Beck, The Rolling Stones, The Who, all four of The Beatles and Steve Miller, joined the group for this album. Hopkins' influence is felt throughout Shady Grove, and his contributions pushed the group in new directions. However, David Freiberg's vocal presence makes the Quicksilver sound of the first two albums still apparent.

Hopkins re-recorded the closing track, "Edward", on his solo album The Tin Man Was a Dreamer, which features members of the Rolling Stones and the Beatles. (“Edward” was a nickname for Nicky Hopkins, made up by Brian Jones during a 1967 session at Olympic Studios in London. The story goes that Jones was tuning his guitar and asked Hopkins to give him an E on the piano; with other noise interfering and Nicky unable to hear what he was saying, Brian eventually shouted out: "Give me an E, like in Edward!") "Joseph's Coat", co-written by John Cipollina and Nick Gravenites, also appears on Big Brother and the Holding Company's album Be a Brother, which featured Gravenites on vocals.

Original guitarist Gary Duncan does not appear on this album, having quit the band for a time.

Critical reception

In his review of the album, for AllMusic, Lindsay Planer writes: "This somewhat uneven effort would sadly foreshadow QMS's journey from psychedelia and into a much more pop-oriented sound on their follow-up, Just for Love (1970). However, enthusiasts of those albums will find much more to revisit on Shady Grove than those who favored the first two records."

Track listing

Personnel
Quicksilver Messenger Service
John Cipollina – guitar, vocals
Nicky Hopkins – piano, organ, celeste, harpsichord, cello
David Freiberg – bass, vocals, guitar, viola
Greg Elmore – drums, percussion

Production
Engineer – Dan Healy, Robert Shumaker, David Brown, Michael Leary
Mixing – Dan Healy, Quicksilver Messenger Service, Snarly Grumble
Executive producer – John Palladino
Mixed at Pacific High Recorders

Charts
 Album

Billboard (United States)

References

Quicksilver Messenger Service albums
1969 albums
Capitol Records albums
Albums recorded at Wally Heider Studios